Joshua Treviño is an American political commentator, formerly a consultant and United States Army officer. He is a former George W. Bush Administration speech writer and was listed as a 2006 Lincoln Fellow with the Claremont Institute. He is a graduate of Furman University. Trevino facilitated a controversial public relations campaign by the Malaysian government to pay conservative U.S. commentators in exchange for favorable coverage of the country.

Controversy
In August 2012, a controversy arose around statements Treviño had made on Twitter over a year previously, following the Israeli military's May 31, 2010, raid on the Mavi Marmara and later in the context of the planned Freedom Flotilla II. In June 2011 he had written: "Dear IDF: If you end up shooting any Americans on the new Gaza flotilla—well, most Americans are cool with that. Including me." Critics accused him of incitement to murder and demanded that The Guardian drop him as a columnist.

Treviño and The Guardian responded by publishing a response in which Treviño stated that "any reading of my tweet of 25 June 2011 that holds that I applauded, encouraged, or welcomed the death of fellow human beings, is wrong, and out of step with my life and record." The Guardian later severed its relationship with Treviño, citing his previously undisclosed partnership with Malaysian business interests.

Malaysian government payment scandal
Between May 2008 and April 2011, Treviño was paid $389,000 by the "Government of Malaysia, its ruling party, or interests closely aligned with either".

His work was to organize a covert opinion campaign against former Malaysian Deputy Prime Minister Anwar Ibrahim. None of those involved with the campaign disclosed that the funds paid were provided by the government of Malaysia. Treviño in turn made payments of up to $36,000 to several conservative American opinion writers who went on to write pro-government pieces on behalf of Malaysia, including his former employer Chuck DeVore, Claire Berlinski, Ben Domenech, Rachel Ehrenfeld and Brad Jackson. Outlets in which their work appeared included the Huffington Post, the San Francisco Examiner, the Washington Times, National Review, and RedState. When questioned in 2011 by the Politico website about whether Malaysian interests funded his activities, Treviño flatly denied it: "I was never on any 'Malaysian entity's payroll,' and I resent your assumption that I was."

In 2013 Treviño filed a statement with the Foreign Registration office of the Department of Justice—five years after being required to make the information public. He explained the late filing by stating that he was unaware of the requirement. Britain's The Guardian banned him from writing as a result of having failed to disclose his Malaysian government ties; a lawyer advised him to contact the Justice Department about filing. Treviño stated, "They let me do a retroactive filing and that was that."

References

External links
 Profile – PolitiFact.com
 Biography – Texas Public Policy Foundation
 

Place of birth missing (living people)
Year of birth missing (living people)
Living people
American political writers
American male non-fiction writers
Furman University alumni
United States Army officers
Texas Republicans
Texas Public Policy Foundation people